The Situation is a 2006 American war drama film directed by Philip Haas and starring Connie Nielsen. It was produced by Liaquat Ahamed, a Pulitzer Prize-winning author.

Premise
The film plays out against the backdrop of the 2003 Iraq War, where an American journalist (who happens to be in a love triangle between a CIA operative and an Iraqi photographer) is collecting material to write a meaningful story.

Cast
 Connie Nielsen as Anna Molyneux
 Damian Lewis as Dan Murphy
 Mido Hamada as Zaid
 John Slattery as Colonel Carrick
 Tom McCarthy as Major Hanks
 Shaun Evans as Wesley

References

External links
 
 
 RottenTomatoes.com review listings for The Situation

2006 drama films
2000s English-language films
2000s American films
2006 films
Films set in Baghdad
Films set in Iraq
Iraq War films
Films directed by Philip Haas
Films scored by Jeff Beal
2000s war drama films
American war drama films